Jan Wraży (10 October 1943 – 7 April 2019) was a Polish footballer. He played seven times for Poland.

References

External links
 

1943 births
2019 deaths
Polish footballers
Poland international footballers
GKS Katowice players
Górnik Zabrze players
Valenciennes FC players
Expatriate footballers in France
Ligue 1 players
Polish expatriate footballers
Sportspeople from Lviv
Association football midfielders